Riverglades is a north suburban locality of Murray Bridge on the east (left) bank of the Murray River.

It is bounded by the Murray River on the north west Loddon Road on the northeast, Mitchell Avenue on the southeast, and Thule Drive (and south-side Thule Drive properties near the river bank) on the south west.

References 

Towns in South Australia